Sir Richard Adam Sykes,  (8 May 1920 – 22 March 1979) was the British Ambassador to the Netherlands, who was assassinated by the IRA in The Hague in 1979.

Early life
Richard Sykes was born on 8 May 1920 to Brigadier A. C. Sykes. For his schooling he attended Wellington College before going up to the University of Oxford, where he attended Christ Church.

Second World War
During the Second World War, Sykes served in the British Army with the Royal Signals from 1940 to 1946. During his service he attained the rank of major. In 1945 he was awarded the Military Cross as well as the Croix de Guerre by France.

Diplomatic career
Sykes joined HM Foreign Service in 1947 and served at the Foreign Office from 1947 to 1948. He then served in Nanking (1948–50), Peking (1950–52) and returned to the UK to serve at the Foreign Office (1952–56). His next overseas postings took him to Brussels (1956–59), Santiago (1959–62) and Athens (1963–66), before returning to the Foreign Office (1967–69).

Sykes' first posting as an ambassador came with a posting to Havana (1970–72) before moving to be a Minister at the British Embassy in Washington D.C. (1972–1975). From there he returned to the Foreign Office as Department Under-Secretary between 1975 and 1977. Sykes was then appointed as Ambassador to the Netherlands in 1977.

Assassination
Sykes was leaving his residence in The Hague at 9 am and was getting into his silver Rolls-Royce limousine when he was shot. He was sitting next to Alyson Bailes. The car door was held by Karel Straub, a 19-year-old Dutch national who worked at the embassy. Straub was also shot in the attack.

Sykes' chauffeur, Jack Wilson, was uninjured and drove Sykes to Westeinde Hospital, where he died two hours later. Straub was transported by ambulance to the same hospital, where he also died.

Later that day, André Michaux, a senior bank official from Belgium, was murdered outside his home in Brussels in a case of mistaken identity; Sir John Killick – British Deputy Ambassador to NATO, who lived opposite Michaux – was believed to be the intended target of the IRA.

Suspects for the assassination were Palestinians or Iraqis, although no evidence was ever put forward. It was ultimately confirmed that the IRA had carried out the killings.

The IRA claimed responsibility for the assassination in February 1980. In a statement they said of Sykes: "[he was] not just a Brit propagandist, as are all British ambassadors, but because he had been engaged in intelligence operations against our organisation."

The 'intelligence operations' mentioned in the statement related to a government report written by Sykes following the assassination of Christopher Ewart-Biggs. Ewart-Biggs was the British Ambassador to the Republic of Ireland and was killed by the IRA in 1976. Sykes produced diplomatic security guidelines as part of his report.

Sykes' position as Ambassador to the Netherlands had been strained due to certain Dutch groups, which were sympathetic to the IRA, and consequent arms smuggling activities.

Family
Sykes was married to Ann, Lady Sykes (née Fisher). The couple had three children. Lady Sykes died in 2018.

Memorials 
There is a memorial plaque to Sykes in St Michael's Church, Wilsford, Wiltshire.

See also
 List of Ambassadors from the United Kingdom to the Netherlands

References

1920 births
1979 deaths
Deaths by firearm in the Netherlands
Ambassadors of the United Kingdom to the Netherlands
Knights Commander of the Order of St Michael and St George
Recipients of the Military Cross
Assassinated British diplomats
People killed by the Provisional Irish Republican Army
British terrorism victims
Terrorism deaths in the Netherlands
British people murdered abroad
People murdered in the Netherlands
Ambassadors of the United Kingdom to Cuba
British Army personnel of World War II
Sykes, Richard
20th century in The Hague
20th-century British diplomats
1979 murders in the Netherlands
Royal Corps of Signals officers
Recipients of the Croix de Guerre 1939–1945 (France)
Alumni of Christ Church, Oxford
British expatriates in the United States
British expatriates in China
British expatriates in Belgium
British expatriates in Chile
British expatriates in Greece